Elisabetta Sgarbi is a filmmaker and editor based in Italy.

Career 
After graduating in pharmacy, she started working at Studio Tesi. She served as the editorial director at Bompiani for over 25 years.

Her works include short films and documentaries, including When the Germans Couldn't Swim, For men only, Twice Delta, Extraliscio - Dance Punk, and The ship on the mountain.

Documentaries 
 When the Germans Couldn't Swim
 For men only
 Twice Delta
 Where is the goldfish?
 The language of the scoundrels - Romanino in Valle Camonica
 Extraliscio - Dance Punk

Short films 
 Miss Vila's Journey
 The ship on the mountain
 “It is so” (2022) by Luca Barbarossa and Extraliscio

References 

Italian film directors
Italian filmmakers
Living people
Year of birth missing (living people)